Rectoris posehensis is a species of cyprinid of the genus Rectoris. It inhabits Asia and is considered harmless to humans.

References

Cyprinid fish of Asia